Sleepy Sleepers (commonly known as Sliipparit in Finland) is a Finnish pop/rock/punk/comedy band founded in 1974 by its two front-men Sakke Järvenpää and Mato Valtonen in Lahti, Finland. Between 1975 and their break-up in 1990 they recorded and issued a total of 19 albums. Sakke and Mato eventually went on to form and front the internationally successful Leningrad Cowboys.

See also
 List of best-selling music artists in Finland

External links 
 Sleepy Sleepers @ pHinnWeb

Finnish musical groups
Finnish comedy musicians